"The Switch" is the 97th episode of NBC sitcom Seinfeld, and the 11th episode of the show's sixth season. It aired on January 5, 1995. In this episode, Jerry wants to switch from dating a non-laughing woman to dating her roommate, Elaine has difficulty retrieving a tennis racket she loaned out, and George enlists Kramer's mother to spy on his seemingly bulimic girlfriend, leading to him learning Kramer's first name.

Plot
After playing tennis, Elaine is recognized by Mrs. Landis, who rejected her application to Doubleday but hints there may be an opening for her. Elaine lends Mr. Pitt's tennis racket to her, hoping to get the job. When she comes by to retrieve the racket, she learns that Landis injured her humeral epicondyle playing tennis. Landis is despondent and tells Elaine she may never be able to play tennis again; Elaine does not ask for the racket back. Jerry suggests she retrieve it while Landis is at lunch. She is caught by Landis' assistant, who does not believe her when she tells him the racket is hers.

Jerry is dating Sandy, a "non-laugher" who seems unamused by his jokes. When Jerry goes to Sandy's apartment he meets Laura, her roommate, who laughs at his jokes and is attractive. Jerry tells George he wants to break up with Sandy and date Laura. Jerry and George brainstorm how to accomplish "the switch". George suggests Jerry propose a ménage à trois. Sandy will be disgusted, break up with Jerry, and tell Laura, who will feel flattered, paving the way for Jerry to ask her out. However, both Sandy and Laura agree to the ménage à trois. Jerry backs out.

George brags to Kramer about his girlfriend Nina, a model who maintains a stunning figure even though she eats a lot.  Kramer suggests she is bulimic, which rings true to George since she always excuses herself to the bathroom after eating. He plans to have a matron spy on her to verify that she is purging. Kramer reveals that his estranged mother Babs works as a matron. Jerry convinces him to reconcile with her. When she sees her son, she yells out "Cosmo!" This comes as a revelation to George, Jerry, and Elaine, who have tried to learn Kramer's first name for years. Kramer finally embraces his first name.

Kramer tells his mother to quit her job and go into business with him. Lacking Babs' help, George goes to the women's bathroom himself. Hearing the noise of someone vomiting, he bursts in, but it turns out to be another woman who is genuinely sick.

Newman is out of town, so Kramer uses his keys to retrieve his tennis racket for Mr. Pitt. When he opens the door, he sees Babs in a compromising position with Newman.

Production
The episode was written by Bruce Kirschbaum and Sam Henry Kass, who usually work individually, but Larry David decided to team them up for the episode. It was titled "The Bulimic" in pre-production drafts.

The name "Cosmo" was suggested by David; he took the name from a boy who lived in the same apartment building as him and Kenny Kramer. The revelation of Kramer's first name was heavily promoted by NBC in the leadup to the episode's first broadcast, and all copies of the script had "X"s in place of every instance of the name "Cosmo" to prevent it being leaked to the press. Though the episode was filmed three weeks before "The Race", it was aired after it so that the Christmas-themed "The Race" could air during the Christmas season.

References

External links
 

Seinfeld (season 6) episodes
1995 American television episodes